Johanna Friederike Charlotte Dorothea Eleonore, Princess of Bismarck, Duchess of Lauenburg (née von Puttkamer; 11 April 1824 – 27 November 1894) was a Prussian noblewoman and the wife of the 1st Chancellor of Germany, Otto von Bismarck.

Early life
She was born at Viartlum manor near Rummelsburg in the Prussian Province of Pomerania (present-day Wiatrołom, Poland), the daughter of Heinrich von Puttkamer (1789–1871) and his wife Luitgarde Agnes von Glasenapp (1799–1863). Her ancestors of the Puttkamer noble family, first mentioned in the 13th century, belonged to the Uradel dynasties of Farther Pomerania and were known for their devoted pietism. Johanna grew up in neighbouring Reinfeld estate (Barnowiec), which her father acquired shortly after her birth.

Life
Johanna met Otto von Bismarck, then owner of Kniephof estate (Konarzewo), in 1844. The Prussian Junker had associated with Pomeranian pietist circles around Adolf von Thadden-Trieglaff, mainly because he had desperately fallen in love with Thadden's daughter Marie. The young woman appreciated his advances, nevertheless, as she was already engaged to Bismarck's school friend Moritz von Blanckenburg, she introduced him to her friend Johanna von Puttkamer at her wedding ceremony. However, not until the married couple took both Otto and Johanna on a journey to the Harz mountains in 1846 did the two seem to become closer to each other. Marie's sudden death from meningitis in November 1846 tipped the scales and Bismarck finally asked Heinrich von Puttkamer for the hand of his daughter.

Marriage and issue
On 28 July 1847 Johanna married Otto von Bismarck in the parish church of Alt-Kolziglow (modern Kołczygłowy) near Reinfeld. The couple had three children: 
Marie (1848–1926), married Count Kuno zu Rantzau in 1878
Herbert (1849–1904), diplomat and politician, had an affair with Princess Elisabeth von Carolath-Beuthen, née Countess von Hatzfeld-Trachenberg, married Countess Marguerite Hoyos von und zu Stichsenstein
Wilhelm (1852–1901), administrative official, married his cousin Sibylle von Arnim

Later life
Unpretentious and deeply religious, Johanna was a loyal friend and an essential support throughout her husband's career. Though Otto von Bismarck never completely got over his love for the late Marie von Thadden and even entered a passionate affair with Princess Katharina Orlova, wife of the Russian envoy Nikolay Alexeyevich Orlov, his marriage with Johanna turned out to be a happy one. Johanna's considerable influence on her husband's politics is documented by their voluminous correspondence, nevertheless, she was rivaled by sharp-witted liberal salonnières like Countess Marie von Schleinitz.

Death
Johanna died on 27 November 1894 at the Bismarck manor in Varzin (Warcino), aged 70. Her husband had a chapel built in the Varzin park, where she was buried. Later, her mortal remains were transferred to the Bismarck Mausoleum in Friedrichsruh.

References

External links

Genealogy of Johanna von Puttkamer
Life of Otto von Bismarck

1824 births
1894 deaths
German Lutherans
German princesses
Princesses by marriage
People from Bytów County
People from the Province of Pomerania
Spouses of chancellors of Germany
Duchesses of Saxe-Lauenburg
Johanna
Johanna